There are at least 33 members of the heaths, wintergreens and monotropes order, Ericales, found in Montana. Some of these species are exotics (not native to Montana) and some species have been designated as Species of Concern.

Allotropa virgata, candystick
Arctostaphylos patula, green-leaf manzanita
Arctostaphylos uva-ursi, kinnikinnick
Cassiope mertensiana, western bell-heather
Cassiope tetragona, arctic bell-heather
Chimaphila menziesii, little prince's pine
Chimaphila umbellata, prince's pine
Gaultheria humifusa, alpine spicy wintergreen
Gaultheria ovatifolia, slender wintergreen
Kalmia microphylla, alpine bog laurel
Ledum glandulosum, glandular labrador-tea
Menziesia ferruginea, false huckleberry
Moneses uniflora, one-flower wintergreen
Monotropa hypopithys, American pinesap
Monotropa uniflora, indian-pipe
Orthilia secunda, one-side wintergreen
Phyllodoce empetriformis, pink mountain-heath
Phyllodoce glanduliflora, yellow mountain-heath
Phyllodoce × intermedia, hybrid mountain-heath
Pterospora andromedea, giant pinedrops
Pyrola asarifolia, pink wintergreen
Pyrola chlorantha, green-flower wintergreen
Pyrola elliptica, white wintergreen
Pyrola minor, lesser wintergreen
Pyrola picta, white-vein wintergreen
Rhododendron albiflorum, white-flowered rhododendron
Vaccinium cespitosum, dwarf huckleberry
Vaccinium membranaceum, common huckleberry
Vaccinium myrtilloides, velvetleaf blueberry
Vaccinium myrtillus, bilberry
Vaccinium ovalifolium, oval-leaf huckleberry
Vaccinium scoparium, grouse whortleberry
Vaccinium uliginosum, bog blueberry

Further reading

See also
 List of dicotyledons of Montana

Notes

Montana
Montana